Imber is a surname. Notable people with the surname include:

 Annabelle Clinton Imber, American jurist
 Gerald Imber, American plastic surgeon
 Lya Imber (1914–1981), Venezuelan medical doctor
 Mike Imber (1940–2011), New Zealand seabird biologist
 Naftali Herz Imber (1856–1909), Galicia-born Jewish poet and Zionist
 Nicky Imber (1920–1996), Austrian-born Jewish sculptor
Shmuel Yankev Imber (1889–1942), Jewish poet writing in Yiddish and Polish
Suzanne Imber (born 1983), British planetary scientist

See also